Gibberula modica is a species of minute sea snail, a marine gastropod mollusk in the family Cystiscidae, (previously placed in the family Marginellidae).

Description
The shell size is 3 millimeters long, decorated with sandy yellows, browns, and whites. The opening is white, and the sides of the opening are ridged.

Distribution
This marine species is endemic to São Tomé and Príncipe.

References

External links
 MNHN, Paris: holotype

Endemic fauna of São Tomé and Príncipe
Invertebrates of São Tomé and Príncipe
Gastropods described in 1987
Taxonomy articles created by Polbot
modica